is a Japanese sports shooter. He competed in the mixed skeet event at the 1984 Summer Olympics.

References

1941 births
Living people
Japanese male sport shooters
Olympic shooters of Japan
Shooters at the 1984 Summer Olympics
Place of birth missing (living people)
Shooters at the 1982 Asian Games
Asian Games medalists in shooting
Asian Games bronze medalists for Japan
Medalists at the 1982 Asian Games
20th-century Japanese people